Thomas Loveday (by 1513 – 28 August 1558) was an English politician.

He was a Member (MP) of the Parliament of England for Gloucester in October 1553 and April 1554. He was Mayor of Gloucester in 1546–47 and 1555–56.

References

1558 deaths
English MPs 1553 (Mary I)
English MPs 1554
Mayors of Gloucester
Members of the Parliament of England (pre-1707) for Gloucester
Year of birth uncertain